Associação Educação Física e Desportiva is a sports club from Torres Vedras, Portugal.

Roller hockey
The team is currently playing in the Portuguese Roller Hockey First Division. For the first time in it history played an international competition Cers Cup.

Basketball

Achievements
Portuguese Proliga: 1
2007–08

External links

Basketball teams in Portugal
Rink hockey clubs in Portugal